Amir Ghafour (born 6 June 1991) is an Iranian volleyball player who plays as an opposite spiker for the Iranian national team and Iranian club Shahdab Yazd.

Career

National team
He was invited to national team in 2011 and made his debut in the adult Iranian national team and participated in the Asian Championship, when Iran won inaugural gold medals. Ghafour debut national game as a fix player in 2012 Summer Olympics qualification with invitations Julio Velasco. Ghafour helped the Iran national team win the second gold medal Asian Championship in 2013 and was named Best Spiker in the tournament. Ghafour competed at the Rio 2016 Summer Olympics. He helped Iran to win a bronze medal in 2017 FIVB Volleyball Men's World Grand Champions Cup and Iran Best scorer with 90 point.

Clubs
Amir Ghafour's career began in 2009, with the Barij Essence Kashan. He after 9 consecutive years played in different Iranian teams like Paykan Tehran, and in 2019 year move to Italian SuperLega. He after having played his first season in Italy with the Vero Volley Monza, joined to the Cucine Lube Civitanova.

Sporting achievements
 FIVB Club World Championship
  Brazil 2019 – with Cucine Lube Civitanova
 CEV Challenge Cup
  2018/2019 – with Vero Volley Monza
 National championships
 2015/2016  Iranian Championship, with Paykan Tehran
 2016/2017  Iranian Championship, with Paykan Tehran
 2019/2020  Italian Cup, with Cucine Lube Civitanova
 National team
 2008  AVC U18 Asian Championship
 2009  FIVB U19 World Championship
 2010  AVC U20 Asian Championship
 2011  AVC Asian Championship
 2013  AVC Asian Championship
 2014  Asian Games
 2017  FIVB World Grand Champions Cup
 2018  Asian Games
 2019  AVC Asian Championship

Individual awards
 2011: FIVB U21 World Championship – Best Server 
 2013: AVC Asian Championship – Best Spiker
 2019: AVC Asian Championship – Best Opposite

References

External links
 Player profile at CEV.eu
 Player profile at LegaVolley.it
 Player profile at WorldofVolley.com
 Player profile at Volleybox.net
 Official Account at Instagram

1991 births
Living people
Iranian men's volleyball players
Olympic volleyball players of Iran
Volleyball players at the 2016 Summer Olympics
Asian Games medalists in volleyball
Asian Games gold medalists for Iran
Volleyball players at the 2014 Asian Games
Medalists at the 2014 Asian Games
Volleyball players at the 2018 Asian Games
Medalists at the 2018 Asian Games
Iranian expatriate sportspeople in Italy
Expatriate volleyball players in Italy
Iranian expatriate sportspeople in Turkey
Volleyball players at the 2020 Summer Olympics
Opposite hitters
People from Kashan
21st-century Iranian people